Exhibition Road (officially Braj Kishore Path) is one of the most important thoroughfare and Central business district in Patna, Bihar, India. It is a commercial center located in the heart of the city. It connects Gandhi Maidan Marg with the Chiraiyatand Flyover. It runs in parallel to the Frazer Road, east to the New Dak Bungalow.

Overview/Transport
Exhibition road is about 1 km away from Patna Junction railway station and 3.5 km from Patna Airport. It is one of the most prominent commercial hub of Patna and is host of number of Hotels in Patna. Exhibition road has residential apartments too. The famous car accessories market of Patna too is located on Exhibition road. Gandhi Maidan Police Station of Patna Police serve this area.

Major landmarks
CDA Patna Building (Rajendra Path)
LIC Building
Big Bazaar (P Mall)
Ashiana Towers
Chevrolet Showroom
Pizza Hut
Standard Chartered Bank
Hotel gargee grand
Domino's Pizza
Patliputra exotica
Indian Summer Cafe
Bindabashini Bhawan
PREMA Honda

Nearby schools
St. Xavier's High School, Patna
EDUscope Multi Activity centre, Patna
Christ Church Diocesan School, Patna
Bankipore Girls' High School
St. Joseph's Convent High School Patna
List of central business districts in India

See also
Frazer Road

References

Neighbourhoods in Patna